Turkey participates in the 2017 Islamic Solidarity Games held in Baku, Azerbaijan from 12 May to 22 May 201. 336 athletes from Turkey were registered to compete in 20 sports at the Games.

Medalists

| width="78%" align="left" valign="top" |

| width="22%" align="left" valign="top" |

References

2017
Islamic Solidarity Games